Cars (Original Motion Picture Soundtrack) is the soundtrack album to the 2006 Disney/Pixar animated film of the same name. Released by Walt Disney Records on June 6, 2006, nine songs from the soundtrack are from popular and contemporary artists. The styles of these songs vary between pop, blues, country, and rock.  The remaining eleven pieces are orchestral scores composed and conducted by Randy Newman. The soundtrack was released three days before the film's release into theaters.

Reception 

At the 49th Grammy Awards the soundtrack was nominated for the Best Compilation Soundtrack Album, while the John Mayer version of "Route 66" was also nominated for Best Solo Rock Vocal Performance and "Our Town" won the award for Best Song Written for a Motion Picture, Television or Other Visual Media. The track was also nominated for Best Original Song at the 79th Academy Awards.

Chart performance 
On November 25, 2006, the soundtrack's position on the Billboard 200 shot up from #126 to #47, with a 209% sales increase of 25,000 units. This was most likely due to the holiday season and the fact that Cars was released on DVD.  This was the first Pixar soundtrack to ever achieve Gold Certification in the United States. It is now Platinum in the U.S.

Weekly charts

Year-end charts

Track listing 
All music/tracks composed and performed by Randy Newman, except where noted.

Lightning McQueen's Fast Tracks 

Lightning McQueen's Fast-Tracks is a compilation album produced by Fred Mollin, that contains "revved-up road tunes" not featured in but inspired by Cars. It was released on the same day as the film's soundtrack.

Certifications

References

External links 
 Film Website

2006 compilation albums
2006 soundtrack albums
2000s film soundtrack albums
Albums arranged by Randy Newman
Albums conducted by Randy Newman
Animated film soundtracks
Country music soundtracks
Pixar soundtracks
Pop soundtracks
Randy Newman soundtracks
Walt Disney Records compilation albums
Walt Disney Records soundtracks